"Girl You're So Together" is a song recorded by Michael Jackson in 1973. Written by Keni St. Lewis, it was later released in 1984 as the second  single from the compilation album Farewell My Summer Love due to the commercial interest that generated from the sales of Jackson's hit 1982 album Thriller.

The song was not released in the US; it was released in the UK, where it hit No. 33 on the UK Singles Chart. The song is written in the key of Eb and performed at 100 beats per minute.

Samples
In 2003, The Wiggles sampled this song on their track "The Dancing Flowers" for their album Whoo Hoo! Wiggly Gremlins!.

Charts

References

1984 songs
1984 singles
Michael Jackson songs
Motown singles
Songs written by Keni St. Lewis